Eman Suleman (born 1 January 1992) is a Pakistani model and actress. She started her modeling career in 2017 and since then appeared in ramps and advertisements. She is also known for her role as Yasmeen in Sarmad Khoosat's Aakhri Station (2018). In 2019, she receives nomination for Best Emerging Model at 18th Lux Style Awards. Eman is a vocal feminist and has endorsed causes such as students' rights and the MeToo movement.

Filmography

Awards and nominations

References

External links
 

1992 births
Living people
Pakistani female models
Pakistani television actresses
21st-century Pakistani actresses
People from Islamabad
Pakistani feminists
Beaconhouse National University alumni